Languages of America may refer to:

 Languages of the United States
 American language (disambiguation)